Sonny Boy Jaro (born March 24, 1982) is a Filipino former professional boxer who competed from 2001 to 2019, and held the WBC and The Ring flyweight titles between March to July 2012.

Biography
Jaro first made a living in making shoes with his father. At 12 years of age, he took up boxing where he had 59 amateur fights.

He began boxing professionally on September 1, 2001.

In his first world title attempt, Jaro challenged Edgar Sosa for the WBC light-flyweight title on September 27, 2008. Despite scoring a knockdown in the 9th round, he ended up losing a unanimous decision.

Jaro got another shot at a world championship where he took on Giovanni Segura for the WBA light-flyweight title on November 21, 2009. He was, however, subdued in the opening round.

After moving up in weight a number of bouts earlier, Jaro defeated Pongsaklek Wonjongkam of Thailand by knockout in the sixth of twelve rounds for the WBC and The Ring flyweight titles on March 2, 2012 in Chonburi, Thailand. However, he would lose the titles to Toshiyuki Igarashi in his first title defense on July 16, 2012.

Professional boxing record

See also
List of world flyweight boxing champions
List of Filipino boxing world champions

References

External links

Sonny Boy Jaro - CBZ Profile

 

1982 births
Living people
Filipino male boxers
People from Silay
Boxers from Negros Occidental
World flyweight boxing champions
World Boxing Council champions
The Ring (magazine) champions
21st-century Filipino people